John Banville: A Critical Introduction is a 1989 book by Rüdiger Imhof, which is the first full-length appraisal of the work of major turn of the century writer John Banville. 

Imhof's book has been characterised as "formalist" by Joseph McMinn, whose John Banville: A Critical Study appeared two years later.

Imhof's book was republished in 1997 following the arrival of The Untouchable.

References

External links
 
 Review by Sean Lysaght in Irish University Review, Vol. 20, No. 1, "The English of the Irish: Special Issue" (Spring, 1990), pp. 214-217

1989 non-fiction books
Critical Introduction, A